USS Palm (AN-28/YN-23) was an Aloe-class net laying ship which was assigned to serve the U.S. Navy during World War II with her protective anti-submarine nets.

Built in Cleveland, Ohio
Palm (AN–28) was laid down as YN–23 at American Shipbuilding Company, Cleveland, Ohio, 18 October 1940; launched February 1941; and commissioned 21 August 1941.

World War II service
Palm served on the Atlantic Ocean terminus of the North Atlantic convoy; in 1943, she operated in and around Argentia and Portland, Maine. Re-designated AN–28 on 20 January 1944, she joined other net tenders in their Pacific Ocean efforts. Palm transported, laid, maintained, and recovered anti-torpedo nets, and maintained buoys in auxiliary tasks that kept the Navy operating.

Post-war decommissioning 
After the war, Palm reported to the Columbia River, Oregon. She was out of commission, in reserve there from 1 January 1947 until September 1962, when transferred to the U.S. Maritime Administration, where she entered the National Defense Reserve Fleet at Olympia, Washington.

References 
 
 NavSource Online: Service Ship Photo Archive - YN-23 / AN-28 Palm

 

Aloe-class net laying ships
Ships built in Cleveland
1941 ships
World War II net laying ships of the United States